Nambiyaar  is a 2016 Tamil language comedy film written and directed by Ganeshaa in his directorial debut. It stars Srikanth and Sunaina in the lead roles alongside comedian Santhanam in the title character. Produced by Srikanth's home production Golden Friday Films and independent producer, Haresh Vikram Vijayakumar (Malaysia), the film is named after the veteran actor M. N. Nambiar who was famous for his villainous roles in yester-year Tamil cinema. Vijay Antony scored the soundtrack and original scores for the film. Despite beginning production during early 2013, the film went through delays before releasing in August 2016. This is the last film Santhanam acting as comedian

Cast

 Srikanth as Ramachandran
 Santhanam as Nambiar
 Sunaina as Saroja Devi
 Delhi Ganesh as Saroja Devi's father
 Jayaprakash as Ramachandran's father
 Vanitha Krishnachandran as Ramachandran's mother
 John Vijay as Police Officer
 Subbu Panchu as Ramachandran's elder brother
 Devadarshini as Ramachandran's sister-in-law
 Arjunan as Arjun
 Mahesh
 Nakshathra Nagesh
 Arya as Baskar (Special appearance)
 Parvathy Omanakuttan as Dharani (Special appearance)
 Vijay Antony (Special appearance)

Production
Ganesh, a former assistant to directors S. S. Rajamouli and Vikraman, announced plans in February 2013 that he would be making a film named Nambiar and had approached actor-music composer Vijay Antony to play the title role. However, due to his prior commitments, he turned down the lead role and agreed to compose music for the film. Subsequently, Srikanth signed the film and agreed to make it his maiden production venture. Comedy actor Santhanam was approached to play another role sharing the same screen length with the lead actor. Actress Sunaina was signed in to play the female lead role. Srikanth's wife Vandana made her entry as the costume designer of the film. Arya was asked to play an important guest role and shot for the film without demanding a remuneration.

Ganesh called this as his "dream project" and also approached Mohan Nambiar, son of veteran villain actor Nambiar and got formal permission from him before naming the film after the actor. The shoot of the first schedule of the film was happening in Chennai in June 2013. The film's release was delayed for two years, before the makers readied the project for release in August 2016.

Soundtrack
Music was composed by Vijay Antony composing for a Srikanth film for the second time after Rasikkum Seemane. Actor Santhanam made his debut as singer with this film.

References

External links
 

Indian comedy films
2010s Tamil-language films
2016 films
Films scored by Vijay Antony
2016 directorial debut films